The 2001 Island Games on the Isle of Man was the 1st edition in which a women's football (soccer) tournament was played at the multi-games competition. It was contested by seven teams.

The Faroe Islands won the inaugural tournament.

Participants

Group phase

Group 1

Group 2

Final stage

Semi-finals

6th place match

5th place match

3rd place match

Final

Final rankings

See also
Men's Football at the 2001 Island Games

External links
Results at RSSSF
Official 2001 website

2001
Women
Island